Nathaniel Greene Pendleton (August 9, 1895 – October 12, 1967) was an American Olympic wrestler, film actor, and stage performer. His younger brother, Edmund J. Pendleton (1899–1987), was a well-known music composer and choir master and organist for the American Church in Paris.

Early life and wrestling career
Nat Pendleton was born as Nathaniel Greene Pendleton in 1895 in Davenport, Iowa to Adelaide E. and Nathaniel G. Pendleton, who was reportedly a descendant of American Revolutionary general Nathanael Greene. Nat studied at Columbia University, where he began his wrestling career and served as captain of the school's team in that sport. He was twice Eastern Intercollegiate Wrestling Association (EIWA) champion in 1914 and 1915. Chosen to compete on the United States wrestling team at the 1920 Summer Olympics in Antwerp, Belgium, Pendleton lost only one match during the competition and was awarded a silver medal. Some controversy continues to surround that outcome. Both Pendleton's Olympic coach, George Pinneo, and his teammate, Fred Meyer, insisted that he won his final match and should have been awarded the gold medal. Pinneo later recalled that loss as the "most unpopular of many unsatisfactory decisions," and Meyer stated, "Pendleton was the winner of that contest, no ifs or buts." Returning to the US he became a professional wrestler and teamed up with promoter Jack Curley. Curley was aggressively promoting Pendleton and issued a series of haughty challenges, among them boasting that Pendleton could beat Ed "Strangler" Lewis and any other wrestler on the same night. John Pesek was enlisted to face Pendleton, and in a legitimate contest held on January 25, 1923, Pesek defeated and injured Pendleton. Pendleton then began appearing in Hollywood films in uncredited parts and minor roles by the mid-1920s.

Film and stage career
Pendleton was cast in at least 94 short films and features, most often being typecast in supporting roles, usually as "befuddled good guys" or as slow-witted thugs, gangsters, and policemen. He appears, for example, in the 1932 comedy Horse Feathers starring the Marx Brothers, performing in that film as one of two college football players who kidnap Harpo and Chico. In the 1936 production The Great Ziegfeld, he portrays the circus strongman Eugen Sandow, a role that brought him the best reviews of his career.

Pendleton appears again as a circus strongman in the Marx Brothers' 1939 feature At the Circus. He can be seen as well in recurring roles in two MGM film series from the 1930s and 1940s. He is Joe Wayman, the ambulance driver, in MGM's Dr. Kildare series and in its spin-off series Dr. Gillespie. He also portrays New York police lieutenant John Guild in The Thin Man series. The former wrestler's final screen appearances are the 1947 releases Scared to Death with Bela Lugosi and Buck Privates Come Home starring Abbott and Costello.

Although Pendleton's professional career outside the wrestling ring was predominantly devoted to film work, he also performed in some stage productions, including in the Broadway plays Naughty Cinderella in 1925 and The Gray Fox in 1928.

Death
Pendleton died in a San Diego, California hospital in 1967 after suffering a heart attack.

Legacy
Pendleton is a member of several halls of fame: the Glen Brand Wrestling Hall of Fame in Waterloo, Iowa, the Iowa Wrestling Hall of Fame in Cresco, Iowa, and the Columbia University Athletics Hall of Fame.  In 2015, his biography was published. Written by Mike Chapman, a veteran wrestling author and historian, it is titled Pendleton: The Amazing Story of Columbia’s Wrestling Olympian and Star of Hollywood.

Filmography

References

External links

1895 births
1967 deaths
20th-century American male actors
Male actors from Iowa
American male film actors
American bodybuilders
Sportspeople from Davenport, Iowa
People associated with physical culture
Wrestlers at the 1920 Summer Olympics
American male sport wrestlers
Medalists at the 1920 Summer Olympics
Actors from Davenport, Iowa
Olympic silver medalists for the United States in wrestling
Columbia Lions wrestlers